Nesaecrepida infuscata is a species of flea beetle in the family Chrysomelidae. It is found in Central America and North America.

References

Further reading

External links

 

Alticini
Articles created by Qbugbot
Beetles described in 1906